Thora Hansson (December 2, 1848 – September 11, 1917) was a Norwegian actress and theatre director. 

She made her stage début at Christiania Theater in 1871, and worked at this theatre until 1899. Thora Hanssom was the first actress to portray Solveig in Henrik Ibsens play Peer Gynt when it premiered in 1876. She was the first manager of the theatre Trondhjems nationale Scene, from 1911 to 1913. From 1914 until her death in Stavanger at age of 69 in 1917, she was director of the theatre in Stavanger.

She was born in Christiania (now called Oslo). Her parents were Jørgen Friederich Neelsen (1808–1862), an architect, and Julie Hedvig Rustad (1821–1878). Thora was married to theatre director Olaf Mørch Hansson (1856–1912) between 1880 and 1896. They were parents to Thorolf Mørch Hansson (1881–1952), a diplomat, and  Gunnar Neels-Hansson (1883–1967), who became a theatre director. Gunnar was the father of the actress Thora Neels-Hansson (1918–2007), better known as Nøste Schwab.

References

1848 births
1917 deaths
Actresses from Oslo
Norwegian stage actresses
Norwegian theatre directors